Rossa may refer to:

Places
 Rossa, Piedmont, a municipality in Italy
 Rossa, Switzerland, a municipality of the Swiss canton of Graubünden
 Rõssa, a village in Orava Parish, Estonia
 Rasos Cemetery (old Rossa in Polish), the oldest cemetery in the city of Vilnius, Lithuania

People

 Rossa (singer) (born 1978), Indonesian singer
 Rossa (surname)